The St. Margrethen–Lauterach line is a  long, single-track, electrified railway line in the Lake Constance region. It connects  station in the Swiss canton of St. Gallen with the Lauterach Nord junction in the Austrian state of Vorarlberg, where it joins the Vorarlberg line. The route is owned and operated by Austrian Federal Railways (ÖBB) and is mainly used by the border station in St. Margrethen.

History 
The Vorarlberg Railway opened the connecting line between the Chur–Rorschach line and the Vorarlberg line on 23 November 23 1872. The first through express train between Zürich and Munich ran just under a year later, on 1 November 1873. The line, as with most of the Austrian railway network, was nationalized prior to World War I. The line was electrified on 2 January 1949.

Additional long-distance EuroCity trains operate over the route between Zürich and Munich but make no intermediate stops. , the line will be modernized and partially expanded to include two tracks, shortening travel times.

References

External links 
 
 Konsequenter Ausbau des Bahnangebots in Vorarlberg

Railway lines in Austria
Transport in Vorarlberg
Railway lines in Switzerland
International railway lines
Railway lines opened in 1872
1872 establishments in Austria-Hungary